The Challenge is a 1922 American silent drama film directed by Tom Terriss and starring Rod La Rocque, Dolores Cassinelli and Warner Richmond.

Cast
 Rod La Rocque as 	Stanley Roberts
 Dolores Cassinelli as Barbara Hastings
 Warner Richmond as Ralph Westley
 De Sacia Mooers as Peggy Royce
 Jane Jennings as 	Mrs. Hastings
 Frank Norcross as 	Mr. Hastings

References

Bibliography
 Connelly, Robert B. The Silents: Silent Feature Films, 1910-36, Volume 40, Issue 2. December Press, 1998.
 Munden, Kenneth White. The American Film Institute Catalog of Motion Pictures Produced in the United States, Part 1. University of California Press, 1997.

External links
 

1922 films
1922 drama films
American silent feature films
Silent American drama films
American black-and-white films
Films directed by Tom Terriss
1920s American films